Salala may refer to:
Salalah, a city in Oman
Salala District, in Liberia
Salala Village, in Jalandhar, India
Salala, Bong County, Liberia
Salala, Pakistan, a mountain ridge on the Afghanistan-Pakistan boundary
Salala (band), an a capella musical trio from southern Madagascar
Salala, the childhood name of Empress Jitō